Glaucocharis incisella is a moth in the family Crambidae. It was described by Stanisław Błeszyński in 1970. It is found in Sri Lanka.

References

Diptychophorini
Moths described in 1970